The 1957 Texas Longhorns baseball team represented the University of Texas at Austin in the 1957 NCAA University Division baseball season. The Longhorns played their home games at Clark Field. The team was coached by Bibb Falk in his 15th season at Texas.

The Longhorns reached the College World Series, but were eliminated by Notre Dame in the quarterfinal.

Personnel

Roster

Coaches

Schedule and results

References

Texas Longhorns baseball seasons
Texas Longhorns
College World Series seasons
Texas Longhorns